David Ionel and Leandro Riedi won the boys' doubles tennis title at the 2020 Australian Open, defeating Mikołaj Lorens and Kārlis Ozoliņš in the final, 6–7(8–10), 7–5, [10–4].

Jonáš Forejtek and Dalibor Svrčina were the defending champions, but Forejtek was no longer eligible to compete in junior events. Svrčina played alongside Jeffrey von der Schulenburg, but lost in the quarterfinals to Jérôme Kym and Dominic Stricker.

Seeds

Draw

Finals

Top half

Bottom half

References 

Boys' Doubles
2020